MT-TV can refer to:

 MT-TV (band)
 MT-TV (mitochondrial)